Punta Pezzo  is a point in Reggio Calabria, southern Italy. It is the closest point of Calabria to Sicily and is the northernmost point of the Calabrian side of the Strait of Messina, lying on the northern channel.

Overview
The coasts of this sea area are crossed by very strong currents and the topography of the beaches varies from year to year because of the very strong winter storms. It is located in the comune of Villa San Giovanni, about 13 km north of Reggio Calabria.

See also
Punta Pezzo Lighthouse

References

Landforms of Calabria
Headlands of Italy